Sinyapkinsky is a rural locality (a khutor) in Sysoyevskoye Rural Settlement, Surovikinsky District, Volgograd Oblast, Russia. The population was 117 as of 2010. There are 3 streets.

Geography 
Sinyapkinsky is located near the Chir River, 43 km southwest of Surovikino (the district's administrative centre) by road. Oblivskaya is the nearest rural locality.

References 

Rural localities in Surovikinsky District